Frog Island is a peninsula on the north bank of the River Thames in Rainham, London at . It is used for vehicle storage in Ferry Lane Industrial Estate and for the mechanical biological treatment works building of the East London Waste Authority.

Uses
The mechanical biological treatment works of the East London Waste Authority, sited here, turns 50% of processed waste into refuse-derived fuel, and recovers metals and glass.  The area since before 1900 has nothing more than a non-raised culverted small ditch invisibly separating it from the rest of the industrial estate to the east and forms a slight depression relative to the bank at only 2m AOD however was a more well-defined island at high tide at the mouth of the River Ingrebourne, that rises in Essex as the Weald Brook.

Phoenix Wharf on the island has safeguarded wharf status.

See also
Islands in the River Thames section: former islands

References

Mechanical biological treatment
Islands of the River Thames
Geography of the London Borough of Havering
Waste management in London
Islands of London
Uninhabited islands of England